Rishabhapriya is a ragam in Carnatic music (musical scale of South Indian classical music). It is the 62nd melakarta rāgam (parent scale) in the 72 melakarta rāgam system of Carnatic music. It is the prati madhyamam equivalent of Charukesi, which is the 26th melakarta. It is called Ratipriya in Muthuswami Dikshitar school of Carnatic music.

Structure and Lakshana

It is the 2nd rāgam in the 11th chakra Rudra. The mnemonic name is Rudra-Sri. The mnemonic phrase is sa ri gu mi pa dha ni. Its  structure (ascending and descending scale) is as follows (see swaras in Carnatic music for details on below notation and terms):
: 
: 

This scale uses the notes chathusruthi rishabham, antara gandharam, prati madhyamam, shuddha dhaivatham and kaisiki nishadham. As it is a melakarta rāgam, by definition it is a sampoorna rāgam (has all seven notes in ascending and descending scale).

Janya rāgams 
A few minor janya rāgams (derived scales) are associated with Rishabhapriya. See List of janya rāgams for all associated scales of Rishabhapriya and other 71 melakarta rāgams.

Compositions
A few compositions which are set to Rishabhapriya are:

Ghana naya desika by Koteeswara Iyer
Maara ratipriyam by Muthuswami Dikshitar
Nandisam vande by Dr. M. Balamuralikrishna
Inta sodhanamulaku by Veene Sheshanna
Mahima dakkinchu by Thyagaraja
Panniru Kaiyane by D. pattamal
 Mahatmule theliyaleru by Mysore vasudevacharyar

Related rāgams 
This section covers the theoretical and scientific aspect of this rāgam.

Rishabhapriya's notes when shifted using Graha bhedam from the panchamam (Pa), yields one other melakarta rāgam, namely Kokilapriya. Graha bhedam is the step taken in keeping the relative note frequencies same, while shifting the shadjam to the next note in the rāgam. "Rishabhapriya" and "Kokilapriya" are also the only melakarta rāgams to contain a wholetone scale. Omitting Pa in "Rishabhapriya" and Sa in "Kokilapriya" yields the scale. For further details and an illustration refer Graha bhedam on Kokilapriya.
 
GOPRIYA is a janya raga created by omitting panchamam in the aarohanam and avarohanam (S R2 G3 M2 D1 N2 S---S N2 D1 M2 G3 R2 S) is special in that doing Grahabhedam on it generates the same raga itself over and over. This is because the notes are equally separated in frequency...source is a lec-dem by S. Soumya in Margazhi Maha Utsavam in January 2017. In western classical music terminology, this is called a Whole Tone Scale (Rudi Seitz, 12 Jan. 2013).

Notes

References

Melakarta ragas